Milford Township is one of the twenty-two townships of Knox County, Ohio, United States.  The 2010 census found 1,772 people in the township.

Geography
Located in the southwestern part of the county, it borders the following townships:
Liberty Township - north
Clinton Township - northeast corner
Miller Township - east
Burlington Township, Licking County - southeast corner
Bennington Township, Licking County - south
Hartford Township, Licking County - southwest corner
Hilliar Township - west
South Bloomfield Township, Morrow County - northwest corner

No municipalities are located in Milford Township, although the unincorporated community of Mt. Liberty lies on the northwestern border with Liberty Township.

Name and history
Milford Township was named after New Milford, Connecticut, by a settler who hailed from there.

Statewide, other Milford Townships are located in Butler and Defiance counties.

Government
The township is governed by a three-member board of trustees, who are elected in November of odd-numbered years to a four-year term beginning on the following January 1. Two are elected in the year after the presidential election and one is elected in the year before it. There is also an elected township fiscal officer, who serves a four-year term beginning on April 1 of the year after the election, which is held in November of the year before the presidential election. Vacancies in the fiscal officership or on the board of trustees are filled by the remaining trustees.

References

External links
County website

Townships in Knox County, Ohio
Townships in Ohio